This article lists the presidents of the Regional Assembly of Murcia, the regional legislature of Murcia.

Presidents

References

Murcia